Wolfgang Konrad (born 22 December 1958) is an Austrian middle-distance runner. He competed in the men's 3000 metres steeplechase at the 1980 Summer Olympics. He has served as the organiser of the  Vienna City Marathon since 1989. He is the father of racing cyclist Patrick Konrad.

References

1958 births
Living people
Athletes (track and field) at the 1980 Summer Olympics
Austrian male middle-distance runners
Austrian male steeplechase runners
Olympic athletes of Austria
Place of birth missing (living people)